Back to Birdland is an album by jazz musician Freddie Hubbard recorded in August 1982 and released on the Real Time label. The Allmusic review by Scott Yanow calls the album "Hubbard's first worthwhile studio recording (with the exception of Super Blue) since the mid-'70s".

Track listing 
All compositions by Freddie Hubbard except as indicated
 "Shaw 'Nuff" (Ray Brown, Gil Fuller, Dizzy Gillespie) - 5:19
 "Star Eyes" (Gene de Paul, Don Raye) - 6:05
 "Lover Man" (Jimmy Davis, Ram Ramirez, James Sherman) - 5:39
 "For B.P." - 6:58
 "Stella by Starlight" (Ned Washington, Victor Young) - 5:18
 "Byrdlike" - 5:42

Personnel 
 Freddie Hubbard: trumpet
 George Cables: piano
 Richie Cole: alto saxophone
 Ashley Alexander: trombone
 Med Flory: alto saxophone (track 6)
 Andy Simpkins: bass
 John Dentz: drums

References 

1983 albums
Real Time Records albums
Freddie Hubbard albums